"Fire in Your New Shoes" is the second single from Dynasty, an album by American house DJ Kaskade. It features the lead singer from Dragonette, Martina Sorbara. It was released digitally on April 13, 2010.

"Fire in Your New Shoes" was also featured in an episode of NCIS: Los Angeles, The Vampire Diaries and Criminal Minds.

Charts

Certifications

Track listings
Digital download - single
 "Fire in Your New Shoes" - 2:39

Fire in Your New Shoes (Remixed)
 "Fire in Your New Shoes" (Angger Dimas Remix) - 6:31
 "Fire in Your New Shoes" (Joachim Garraud Vocal Mix) - 6:53
 "Fire in Your New Shoes" (Joachim Garraud Dub Mix) - 6:23
 "Fire in Your New Shoes" (Ming Radio Edit) - 3:59
 "Fire in Your New Shoes" (Ming Extended Mix) - 4:59
 "Fire in Your New Shoes" (Innerpartysystem Radio Edit) - 3:26
 "Fire in Your New Shoes" (Innerpartysystem Mix) - 4:56
 "Fire in Your New Shoes" (Innerpartysystem Extended Mix) - 6:30
 "Fire in Your New Shoes" (Innerpartysystem Instrumental Mix) - 4:56

Digital download - remix single
 "Fire in Your New Shoes" (Sultan & Ned Shepard Electric Daisy Remix) - 7:11

Credits and personnel
 Vocals – Martina Sorbara
 Guitar – Mark Phillips
 Lyrics – Ryan Raddon, Finn Bjarnson, Martina Sorbara
 Music – Ryan Raddon, Finn Bjarnson, Mark Phillips
 Label: Ultra Records

References

2010 singles
2010 songs
Kaskade songs
Songs written by Kaskade
Ultra Music singles
Songs written by Martina Sorbara
Songs written by Finn Bjarnson